Corwin House may refer to:

 Thomas Corwin House, in Lebanon, Ohio, U.S.
 Taylor–Corwin House, in Pine Bush, New York, U.S.
 Jonathan Corwin House, or The Witch House, in Salem, Massachusetts, U.S.